Live at the Corner may refer to:

 Live at the Corner (Ash Grunwald), 2005
 Live at the Corner (Something for Kate album), 2008
 Live at the Corner (Tame Impala album), 2010